Drobnjak may refer to:

 Drobnjak, Montenegro, a region in Montenegro and tribe

or:

 Anto Drobnjak, Montenegrin football player
 Branislav Drobnjak, Montenegrin football player
 Dragiša Drobnjak, Slovenian basketball player
 Predrag Drobnjak, Montenegrin basketball player
 Vladimir Drobnjak, Croatian diplomat

Serbian surnames
Montenegrin surnames
Toponymic surnames